Dragoș or Dragoš is a Romanian/Serbian given name of Slavic origin but can also appear as a surname. It derives from Slavic word root -drag, meaning "dear, beloved".
It may refer to:

 Dragoș (died c. 1353), Moldavian ruler
 Dragoș Bucur, Romanian actor
 Dragoș Coman, Romanian swimmer
 Dragoș Grigore, Romanian football player
 Dragoș Mihalache, Romanian retired football player
 Dragoș Mihalcea
 Dragoș Protopopescu
 Dragoš Kalajić

In Czech the equivalent Drahoš is used as a surname as in the case of former presidential candidate Jiří Drahoš. It is common in North Slavic languages such as Czech to turn the 'g' into 'h'.

See also
Slavic influence on Romanian

References

Romanian masculine given names